Rev. Col. John Hancock Sr. (March 1, 1671December 6, 1752) was a colonial American clergyman, soldier, planter, politician, and paternal grandfather of American politician John Hancock III.

Hancock graduated from Harvard College in 1689 and was ordained that year. He taught at the Grammar School at Cambridge, Massachusetts starting in 1691. In 1692 he was engaged as the preacher at Medford, Massachusetts, where he lived and served until November 1693. He was invited to preach at Lexington, Massachusetts in 1697, and remained the pastor there for 55 years, until his death in 1752.
His sons:
Col. John Hancock Jr. (1702–1744), was also a minister and was father of the politician John Hancock.
Thomas Hancock (1703–1764) was a merchant in Boston who built the Hancock–Clarke House for his father. 

He is buried at the Old Burying Ground in Lexington, Massachusetts.

References

External links
Deed from Isaac Powers to John Hancock for Jack (a slave), 22 April 1728

1671 births
1752 deaths
Harvard College alumni
Massachusetts colonial-era clergy
Burials in Massachusetts
Hancock family of Massachusetts